Cecily is a given name, one of the English forms of Latin Cecilia. Notable people with the name include:

 Cecily Adams (1958–2004), American actress, casting director, and lyricist
 Cecily Bonville, 7th Baroness Harington (1460–1529), English peeress
 Cecily Brown (born 1969), British painter
 Cecily Lefort (1900–1945), British World War II agent
 Cecily Neville, Duchess of York (1415–1495), mother of two English kings
 Cecily Norden (1918–2011), South African author and equestrian
 Cecily Maude O'Connell (1884–1965) Australian trade unionist and religious social worker
 Cecily O'Neill, American theater educator
 Cecily Polson, Australian actress
 Cecily Sash (1924–2019), South African painter, professor
 Cecily Strong (born 1984), American actress and comedian
 Cecily Tynan (born 1969), Philadelphia broadcast personality
 Cecily of York (1469–1507), sister of King Edward V of England
 Cecily von Ziegesar (born 1970), American author of novels written for teenagers

See also 
 Cicely (disambiguation)

English feminine given names